Clara C. Frye (1872–1936) was an American nurse in Tampa, Florida who established the Clara Frye Hospital, where she worked for 20 years in the early 1900s. Frye's hospital admitted patients of all ethnicities.

Frye moved to Tampa in 1901 and in 1908 opened a hospital for black patients in her home, making it Tampa's only hospital to admit Black people. Her dining room table was the operating table. Frye was the only permanent employee of the hospital. A building was secured in 1923 and was purchased by the City of Tampa in 1928. At the time, the Tampa Municipal Hospital, now Tampa General Hospital, did not admit African American patients. This changed in the 1950s.

The Clara Frye Memorial Hospital that existed in West Tampa from 1938 to 1967 was named after her. The original Tampa General Hospital building was renamed after Frye in 1991. Frye will also be immortalized along with other prominent Tampa historical figures on the Tampa Riverwalk with a bronze bust.

A memorial garden at Water Works Park (Tampa) honors her legacy.

References

Bibliography 

 

1872 births
1936 deaths
African-American nurses
Nurses from Florida
American women nurses
People from Tampa, Florida
20th-century African-American people
20th-century African-American women
Florida Women's Hall of Fame Inductees